Harri Kampman (born 13 May 1954 in Oulu) is a Finnish football manager and former footballer, who has managed among others Motherwell, MyPa, FC Lahti, and AC Oulu.

Managerial stats

References

External links

1954 births
Living people
Sportspeople from Oulu
Finnish football managers
Motherwell F.C. managers
Tampere United managers
FC Lahti managers
Scottish Football League managers
Scottish Premier League managers
Finnish expatriates in the United Kingdom
Expatriate football managers in Scotland